Rubbiani is a surname. Notable people with the surname include:

Felice Rubbiani (1677–1752), Italian painter 
Matteo Rubbiani (born 1978), Italian pole vaulter

Italian-language surnames